Joan Robb ( – 19 October 2017) was a New Zealand herpetologist and wildlife tour guide.

Academic career 

Robb grew up in Gisborne, and was educated at home through the Correspondence School. After a Diploma in Agriculture from Massey Agricultural College, she studied at the University of Auckland, graduating with an MSc in zoology in 1956. Robb then worked in the Department of Zoology at the University of Auckland, becoming an associate professor in 1967. She taught vertebrate form and function. She retired in 1978, after which she became a tour guide for wildlife tours to Malaysia, Nepal, China, Australia, and Africa.

Robb held positions on the Fauna Protection Advisory Council (an advisory group to the Department of Internal Affairs, who were then responsible for conservation) and the Council of the Auckland Museum.

Robb's research focused on herpetology, particularly New Zealand lizards, and she named five new taxa of skink and gecko. Her 1980 book describing New Zealand amphibians and reptiles was considered to be "academic in quality, but popular in tone".

In 2017, Robb was named as one of the Royal Society Te Apārangi's 150 women in 150 words.

Robb died in Auckland on 19 October 2017.

Taxa named by Robb 

 Gold-striped gecko
 Macgregor's skink
 Oligosoma pachysomaticum
 Robust skink
 Stephen's Island gecko

Selected works

References 

Academic staff of the University of Auckland
New Zealand women academics
New Zealand herpetologists
2017 deaths
1921 births